Drvoš is a village in the municipality of Bosilovo, North Macedonia.

Demographics
According to the 2002 census, the village had a total of 699 inhabitants. Ethnic groups in the village include:

Macedonians 699

References

External links
Visit Macedonia

Villages in Bosilovo Municipality